Joseph Christopher Cox Goods (born 25 June 1994) is a Panamanian footballer who plays as a forward for.

References

External links

1994 births
Living people
Association football forwards
Panamanian footballers
C.D. Árabe Unido players
Club Atlético Independiente footballers
Unión Deportivo Universitario players
Envigado F.C. players
América de Cali footballers
Aragua FC players
Liga Panameña de Fútbol players
Venezuelan Primera División players
Categoría Primera A players
Panamanian expatriate footballers
Panamanian expatriate sportspeople in Colombia
Expatriate footballers in Colombia
Panamanian expatriate sportspeople in Venezuela
Expatriate footballers in Venezuela